Beyt-e Obeyd (also Romanized as Beyt-e ‘Obeyd) is a village in Jaffal Rural District, in the Central District of Shadegan County, Khuzestan Province, Iran. At the 2006 census, its population was 841, in 122 families.

References 

Populated places in Shadegan County